The 2015 Kumho Tyres Australian V8 Touring Car Series was an Australian motor racing competition for de-registered V8 Supercars. It was sanctioned by the Confederation of Australian Motor Sport as a National Series, with Tri State Racing Pty Ltd appointed as the Category Manager. The series was the eighth in a sequence of annual Australian V8 Touring Car Series and the fifth to carry sponsorship from Kumho Tyres.

The series was won by Liam McAdam.

Entries

Series schedule
The series was contested over five rounds.

Classes
Drivers competed in two classes:
 Pro - for drivers of cars entered by professional race teams and car preparers
 Privateer - for drivers who prepared and operated their own car(s)

Points system
Series points were awarded on the following basis at each round:

Series standings

References

Kumho
V8 Touring Car Series